Caecilia caribea is a species of caecilian in the family Caeciliidae. It is endemic to Colombia. Its natural habitats are subtropical or tropical moist lowland forests, subtropical or tropical moist montane forests, plantations, rural gardens, and heavily degraded former forest.

References

caribea
Amphibians of Colombia
Endemic fauna of Colombia
Amphibians described in 1942
Taxonomy articles created by Polbot